That Same Old Obsession is a song by Gordon Lightfoot, released on the 1972 Old Dan's Records album.

Chart performance

Gordon Lightfoot songs
1972 songs
Songs written by Gordon Lightfoot
1972 singles
Song recordings produced by Lenny Waronker
Reprise Records singles